Peter William O'Hearn  (born 13 July 1963 in Halifax, Nova Scotia), formerly a research scientist at Meta, is a Distinguished Engineer at Lacework and a Professor of Computer science at University College London (UCL). He has made significant contributions to formal methods for program correctness. In recent years these advances have been employed in developing industrial software tools that conduct automated analysis of large industrial codebases.

Education
O'Hearn attained a BSc degree in computer science from Dalhousie University, Halifax, Nova Scotia (1985), followed by MSc (1987) and PhD (1991) degrees from Queen's University, Kingston, Ontario, Canada. His dissertation was on Semantics of Non-interference: A natural approach, supervised by Robert D. Tennent.

Career and research
O'Hearn is best known for separation logic, a theory he developed with John C. Reynolds that unearthed new domains for scaling logical reasoning about code. This built on prior research from O'Hearn and David Pym on logic for resources, termed bunched logic. With Stephen Brookes, Carnegie Mellon University, O'Hearn created Concurrent Separation Logic (CSL), extending the theory further. Tony Hoare, in discussing the grand challenge of program verification, described CSL as "solving two problems...concurrecy and object orientation".

He conducted a study of programming languages which were similar to ALGOL, with his former doctoral advisor Robert D. Tennent, which became the book Algol-Like Languages.

Separation logic has given rise to the Infer Static Analyzer (Facebook Infer), a static program analysis utility developed by O'Hearn's team at Facebook. After 20 plus years in academia, O'Hearn began working at Facebook in 2013 with the acquisition of Monoidics Ltd, a startup he cofounded. Since its inception, Infer has enabled Facebook engineers to resolve tens of thousands of bugs before reaching production. It was open sourced in 2016, and is used by Amazon Inc, Spotify, Mozilla, Uber, and others. In 2017, O'Hearn and the team open sourced RacerD, an automated static race condition detection tool that reduces the time it takes to flag potential problems in concurrent software, as part of the Infer platform.

O'Hearn was an assistant professor at Syracuse University, New York, United States, from 1990 to 1995.
He was a reader in computer science at Queen Mary University of London from 1996 to 1999 and then a full professor at Queen Mary until his move to University College London. At UCL he was granted a Chair sponsored by the Royal Academy of Engineering and Microsoft Research. In 1997 he was a visiting scientist at Carnegie Mellon University and in 2006 he was a visiting researcher at Microsoft Research Cambridge. He now shares his time working as a Distinguished Engineer at Lacework and a professor at UCL.

Awards and honours
In 2007, O'Hearn was granted a Royal Society Wolfson Research Merit Award. In 2011, O'Hearn and Samin Ishtiaq were awarded a Most Influential POPL Paper Award. With Stephen Brookes, Carnegie Mellon University, he was co-recipient of the 2016 Gödel Prize, for the invention of Concurrent Separation Logic. Also in 2016, he was elected Fellow of the Royal Academy of Engineering (FREng) and co-received the annual CAV (Computer Aided Verification) award. In 2018, he was elected Fellow of the Royal Society (FRS), and was bestowed with an Honorary Doctor of Laws from Dalhousie University. January 2019 saw O'Hearn honoured with another Most Influential POPL Paper Award, which he shared with three colleagues. The Institute of Electrical and Electronics Engineers (IEEE) granted O'Hearn and three of his Facebook colleagues an IEEE Cybersecurity Award for Practice at their annual awards ceremony in October, 2021.

References

External links

1963 births
Living people
People from Halifax, Nova Scotia
Dalhousie University alumni
Queen's University at Kingston alumni
Canadian emigrants to England
British computer scientists
Canadian computer scientists
Formal methods people
Canadian Fellows of the Royal Society
Fellows of the Royal Academy of Engineering
Syracuse University faculty
Academics of Queen Mary University of London
Academics of University College London
Facebook employees
Gödel Prize laureates
Royal Society Wolfson Research Merit Award holders